International Neuroscience Institute or INI is an international research institute and hospital in Hanover, Germany. In this hospital treatments contains treating diseases of brain, spinal cord diseases, diseases of peripheral nerves, tumors and etcetera. In addition, animal testing can also be performed.

References 

Hospitals in Germany
Neuroscience research centers in Germany